Cross ownership is a method of reinforcing business relationships by owning stock in the companies with which a given company does business. Heavy cross ownership is referred to as circular ownership. The Japanese economy is alleged to be heavily characterized by cross ownership.

In the US, "cross ownership" also refers to a type of investment in different mass-media properties in one market.

Cross ownership of stock
Countries noted to have high levels of cross ownership include:
 Japan
 Germany

Positives of cross ownership:
 Closely ties each business to the economic destiny of its business partners
 Promotes a slow rate of economic change

Cross ownership of shares is criticized for:
 Stagnating the economy
 Wasting capital that could be used to improve productivity
 Expanding economic downturns by preventing reallocation of capital
 Lessening control of shareholders over corporate leadership.

A major factor in perpetuating cross ownership of shares is a high capital gains tax rate.  A company has less incentive to sell cross owned shares if taxes are high because of the immediate reduction in the value of the assets.

For example, a company owns $1000 of stock in another company that was originally purchased for $200.  If the capital gains tax rate is 25% (like in Germany), the profit of $800 would be taxed for $200, causing the company to take a $200 loss on the sale.

Long term cross ownership of shares combined with a high capital tax rate greatly increases periods of asset deflation both in time and in severity.

Media cross ownership

Cross ownership also refers to a type of media ownership in which one type of communications (say a newspaper) owns or is the sister company of another type of medium (such as a radio or TV station). One example is The New York Timess former ownership of WQXR Radio and the Chicago Tribune'''s similar relationship with WGN Radio (WGN-AM) and Television (WGN-TV).

The Federal Communications Commission generally does not allow cross ownership, to keep from one license holder having too much local media ownership, unless the license holder obtains a waiver, such as News Corporation and the Tribune Company have in New York.

The mid-1970s cross-ownership guidelines grandfathered already-existing cross ownerships, such as Tribune-WGN, New York Times-WQXR and the New York Daily News'' ownership of WPIX Television and Radio.

References 

Business ownership
Strategic management